Vadim Petrovich Shcherbakov was an officer in the Soviet Air Defense Forces (PVO Strany). As a senior lieutenant, he was serving in the 260th "Bryansky" Anti-Aircraft Missile Regiment. In 1966–1967 Shcherbakov's whole regiment was temporarily assigned as a Group of Soviet Military Advisors in Vietnam (Группа советских военных специалистов во Вьетнаме) and in March 1966 was transferred to North Vietnam, where the regiment was tasked with establishing a training center and training the NVA's 274th Anti-Aircraft Missile Regiment for combat duty. In North Vietnam Shcherbakov served as a SAM operator/instructor, and specialized as a fire control operator during combat deployments. For his service Shcherbakov received the Order of Lenin, the highest Soviet decoration after returning from North Vietnam in 1967.

American Task Force Russia: POW/MIA in their 18th report claims that formerly closed Soviet sources credited Colonel Shchbakov with 10 combat engagements and 6 kills. After Vietnam, Shcherbakov continued his service, eventually reaching the rank of colonel. Very little is known about his biography except for multiple brief mentions in Soviet Officers' Vietnam War memoirs. He was still alive in 1991, when he was attending an annual meeting of the Russian Association of Vietnam War veterans. He was a retired Colonel at that time.

Shcherbakov appears to have lived in Engels, Saratov Oblast, as of 2013.

Notes

References

Davies, Peter. F-105 Wild Weasel vs SA-2 "Guideline" SAM, Vietnam 1965–73. Osprey 2011. .
Michel III, Marshall L.  Clashes; Air Combat Over North Vietnam 1965–1972.  Naval Institute Press; 1997, 2007.  .
Toperczer, Istvan. MiG-21 Units of the Vietnam War. Osprey Combat Aircraft #29. 2008 edition. .
Toperczer, Istvan. MiG-17 and MiG-19 Units of the Vietnam War. Osprey Combat Aircraft #25. 2nd edition 2008.  .
Hobson, Chris. Vietnam Air Losses, United States Air Force, Navy and Marine Fixed Wing Aircraft Losses in Southeast Asia 1961-1973. Midland Publishing 2001.  .

Military personnel of the Vietnam War
Soviet Air Defence Force officers
Living people
Recipients of the Order of Lenin
Year of birth missing (living people)